Budal is a former municipality in the old Sør-Trøndelag county, Norway. The  municipality existed from 1879 until its dissolution in 1964. It encompassed the Bua and Ena river valleys in the south-central part of the what is now Midtre Gauldal municipality in Trøndelag county. The administrative center of Budal was the village of Enodden where Budal Church is located.

History
The parish of Budal was established as a municipality in 1879 when it was separated from the municipality of Støren.  Initially, Budal had a population of 585.  During the 1960s, there were many municipal mergers across Norway due to the work of the Schei Committee.  On 1 January 1964, Budal (population: 529) was merged with the municipalities of Singsås (population: 1,554), Soknedal (population: 1,916), and Støren (population: 2,296) to form the new municipality of Midtre Gauldal.

Name
The municipality (originally the parish) is named after the old Budalen farm since the first Budal Church was built there. The first element is the name of the local river Bua. That name is the same as the word  which refers to a "place where people live".

Government
While it existed, this municipality was responsible for primary education (through 10th grade), outpatient health services, senior citizen services, unemployment, social services, zoning, economic development, and municipal roads. During its existence, this municipality was governed by a municipal council of elected representatives, which in turn elected a mayor.

Municipal council
The municipal council  of Budal was made up of 13 representatives that were elected to four year terms. The party breakdown of the final municipal council was as follows:

Mayors
The mayors of Budal:

 1879–1898: Lars Storrø (H)
 1898-1898: Ellef Tollefsen Storbudal (H)
 1899–1901: Nils Estensen Indseth (H)
 1902–1913: Johan Bakken (V)
 1914–1916: Ole Enlid (Ap)
 1917–1919: Arnt Sæthermo (V)
 1920–1925: Tollef Ellefsen Budal (Bp)
 1926–1931: Arnt Sæthermo (V)
 1932-1932: Bersvend Bjerkli (Bp)
 1933-1933: Sven J. Enlid (Ap)
 1933–1934: Arnt P. Sørløkken (Ap)
 1935–1940: Nils Nilsen Indseth (Ap)
 1941–1942: Fredrik Lillegraven (NS)
 1942–1945: Arnt Storrøsæter (NS)
 1945-1945: Nils Nilsen Indseth (Ap)
 1946-1946: Gunnar Enlid (Ap)
 1946–1947: Ingebrigt Raphaug (Ap)
 1948–1951: Nils Nilsen Indseth (Ap)
 1952–1955: Ingebrigt Raphaug (Ap)
 1956–1959: Gunnar Enlid (Ap)
 1960–1963: Jacob Hindbjørgen (Ap)

See also
List of former municipalities of Norway

References

Midtre Gauldal
Former municipalities of Norway
1879 establishments in Norway
1964 disestablishments in Norway